Aliabad (also Romanized as ʿAlīābād) is a village in Kaki Rural District, Kaki District, Dashti County, Bushehr Province, Iran. At the 2006 census, its population was 128, in 32 families.

References 

Populated places in Dashti County